Samy Deluxe is the self-titled debut album by German rapper Samy Deluxe, released on 20 April 2001 over EMI. In Germany sold the album 150.000 times, making it a Gold record.

Track listing

Charts

Weekly charts

Year-end charts

References

Sources
http://www.laut.de/Samy-Deluxe/Samy-Deluxe-%28Album%29

2001 albums
Samy Deluxe albums
German-language albums